Gerard "Gerrit" Peters (31 July 1920 – 6 April 2005) was a Dutch track and road cyclist who was active between 1941 and 1956. On track he won the world title in the individual pursuit in 1946 and the European title in madison in 1950. On the road, he won six six-day races, in Ghent (1950), Paris (1950, 1953), Berlin (1954), Antwerpen (1954) and Münster (1955). He also rode in the 1951 Tour de France.

References

1920 births
2005 deaths
Dutch male cyclists
Sportspeople from Haarlem
UCI Track Cycling World Champions (men)
Dutch track cyclists
Cyclists from North Holland
20th-century Dutch people
21st-century Dutch people